John Dyer (died after 1403) was a cloth merchant and member of the Parliament of England for the constituency of Maldon in Essex in the parliaments of April 1384 and February 1388. He was also wardman of Maldon in 1385–1387, assessor of taxes in 1387–1390, and warden of leather in 1395–96.

References 

Members of Parliament for Maldon
English MPs April 1384
Cloth merchants
14th-century English businesspeople
15th-century English businesspeople
English MPs February 1388